Lakshmipur, also spelt Laxmipur, with an area of 1455.96 km2, is a district of Bangladesh. It is bordered by Chandpur to the north, Bhola and Noakhali districts to the south, Noakhali to the east, and Barisal and Bhola districts to the west. Lakshmipur was the part of Noakhali until 15 February 1984.

Administration
The district of Lakshmipur consists of 4 municipalities, 58 union parishads, 514 villages, 3539 mosques, 45 temples, and 1 church.

The upazilas under this district are:
Lakshmipur Sadar Upazila
Ramganj Upazila
Raipur Upazila
Ramgati Upazila
Kamalnagar Upazila

Police stations 
There are 6 police stations in Lakshmipur.

 Lakshmipur Model Thana
 Ramganj Thana
 Raipur Thana
 Ramgati Thana
 Kamalnagar Thana
 Chandragonj Thana

Demographics 

According to the 2011 Bangladesh census, Lakshmipur District had a population of 1,729,188, of which 827,780 were males and 901,408 females. Rural population was 1,466,191 (84.79%) while the urban population was 262,997 (15.21%). Lakshmipur district had a literacy rate of 49.40% for the population 7 years and above: 48.94% for males and 49.81% for females.

As of the 2011 census, 96.55% are Muslims, 3.44% Hindus. The Hindu population has decreased slightly from 63,000 in 1981 to 59,000 in 2011.

Education
Lakshmipur Aliya Madrasa, founded in 1872
Raipur Alia Madrasa, founded in 1886
Bhawaniganj Karamatia Senior Madrasa, founded in 1904
Mandari ML High School, laxmipur
Protapgonj High School, Chandraganj
Lakshmipur Government Girl's High School
Lakshmipur Government College
Lakshmipur Government Women's College
Lakshmipur Adarsha Samad Government High School
Charshahi Islamia Alim Madrasa, founded in 1920.
Toomchar Islamia Kamil Madrasah, Sadar
Panpara high School, Ramgonj
Dalal Bazar N.k. high school, Dalal Bazar
Hazir Hat Millat Govt. School

Notable people

 Mohammad Mohammadullah, 3rd President of Bangladesh
 Nishat Majumdar, first women Everest climber from Bangladesh
 Abdul Matin Chowdhury, 14th vice-chancellor of the University of Dhaka
 A. N. M Momtaz Uddin Choudhury, first vice-chancellor of Islamic University, Bangladesh
 Abdul Mannan, MP for Lakshmipur-4
 Abul Khair Bhuiyan, former MP for Lakshmipur-2
 A.K.M. Shahjahan Kamal, former Minister of Civil Aviation and Tourism
 A. N. M. Shamsul Islam, former MP for Lakshmipur-1
 A. S. M. Abdur Rab, politician and founder of the Jatiya Samajtantrik Dal-JSD
 Chowdhury Khurshid Alam, former MP for Lakshmipur-2
 Gholam Sarwar Husseini, politician and former Pir of Dayra Sharif, Shyampur
 Hafezzi Huzur, founder of Bangladesh Khilafat Andolan
 Harunur Rashid, former MP for Lakshmipur-2
 Husne Ara Shahed, author and writer
 Khairul Enam, former MP for Lakshmipur-3
 M. A. Awal, former MP for Lakshmipur-1
 Mohammad Noman, Jatiya Party politician
 Mohammad Shahid Islam, MP for Lakshmipur-2
 Mohammad Toaha, activist of the Bengali Language Movement and politician
 M. M. Ruhul Amin, 16th Chief Justice of Bangladesh
 Muhammad Abdullah, academic
 Nazim Uddin Ahmed, former MP for Lakshmipur-1
 Selina Parvin, journalist and poet
 Shahiduddin Chowdhury Annie, former MP for Lakshmipur-3
 S I M Nurunnabi Khan, writer and freedom fighter
 Syed Abul Kalam Azad, former treasurer of the University of Dhaka
 Tofail Ahmed, folk researcher
 Tufail Mohammad, Punjabi military officer and second recipient of the Nishan-e-Haider
 Ziaul Haque Zia, former MP for Lakshmipur-1

References

 
Districts of Chittagong Division
Districts of Bangladesh